Ülo Vinter (3 January 1934 in Tallinn – 2 July 2000 in Käsmu) was an Estonian composer.

In 1951 he graduated from Tallinn Music High School in music theory. Afterwards he graduated from Tallinn State Conservatory in composition speciality.

From 1956 to 1969 he was the music editor at Estonian Radio and from 1969 to 1986 at Eesti Telefilm.

He has created music for several Estonian cult films, including Mehed ei nuta ('Men Don't Cry') (1968), A Young Retiree (1972) and Here We Are! (1979).

Since 1958 he was a member of Estonian Composers' Union.

Works
 1969: children’s musical "Pippi Longstocking" (co-author Ülo Raudmäe)
 orchestral suite "Paunvere"
 Paunvere (Süit Sümfooniaorkestrile) (10"), 1968 
 Väiksed Nipid (LP), 1986

References

1934 births
2000 deaths
Estonian film score composers
20th-century Estonian composers
Estonian Academy of Music and Theatre alumni
People from Tallinn